Valgerður Gunnarsdóttir is an Icelandic politician, a member of the Icelandic parliament, and the former headmaster of Laugar Junior College. She was a member of Húsavík town council from 1986 to 1998 and served as the president of the town council from 1994 to 1998.

Valgerður has been a member of the Budget Committee since 2013 and a member of the Icelandic Delegation to the Nordic Council from the same year. She has been a member of the Parliamentary Assembly of the Council of Europe since 2016 and serves as deputy chairman for the Icelandic delegation.

References 

1955 births
Living people
Valgerdur Gunnarsdottir
Valgerdur Gunnarsdottir
Valgerdur Gunnarsdottir
Valgerdur Gunnarsdottir